William Higgins (born December 15, 1952) is an American former professional basketball shooting guard who spent one season in the American Basketball Association (ABA) as a member of the Virginia Squires during the 1974–75 season. Born in Toledo, Ohio, he was drafted from Ashland University by the New Orleans Jazz during the seventh round of the 1975 NBA draft, but he did not play for them.

Higgins played three years of college basketball at Ashland before moving to the ABA after his junior season.

References

External links
 

1952 births
Living people
American men's basketball players
Ashland Eagles men's basketball players
Basketball players from Ohio
New Orleans Jazz draft picks
Shooting guards
Sportspeople from Toledo, Ohio
Virginia Squires players